Alla Aleksandrovna Abdalova (born June 19, 1941) is a Soviet singer and stage actress.

Biography 

She was born on June 19, 1941.

She graduated from GITIS, where she was a student of Maria Maksakova Sr. Abdalova's mezzo-soprano is distinguished by a low, warm, rich timbre.

After an unsuccessful attempt to enter the Bolshoi Theater, she was accepted into the Operetta Theater.

For a long time she sang in the orchestra with Leonid Utyosov and worked in the Moscow Concert.

Personal life
From 1966 to 1976, she was married to Lev Leschenko. The marriage lasted 10 years, and ended in divorce, initiated by Abdalova.

After the divorce from Leshchenko, Alla did not get remarried, and had no children. Her quality of life rapidly declined due to loneliness and bad habits. Despite this, she refused assistance from Leshenko.

As of 2015, Alla Abdalova retired, left her Moscow apartment, and lives with her relatives in the village.

Songs 

 A Song About a Friend 
 Nadezhda
 The Moscow Windows 
Lilies of the Valley
Queen of Beauty 
Snow is Falling 
Waltz from Beware of the Car
That the Heart was so Unsettled 
On that Road 
Snowfall 
Old Maple 
As Escort Ships 
Instrumental Piece  
Black Cat 
A Song About Bears 
Our Neighbor 
Are Standing Girls 
Return of Hope 
Camomiles Hid 
When the Spring...

In 2004, a compilation was released featuring the songs of Alla Abdalova.

References

External links 
 Алла Абдалова — биография
  Алла Абдалова — Знаменитости в кино

1941 births
Living people
Russian mezzo-sopranos
Soviet women singers
Soviet stage actresses
Russian Academy of Theatre Arts alumni
20th-century Russian women singers
20th-century Russian singers